Hua Jiansheng (born 6 January 1963) is a Chinese sports shooter. He competed in the men's 10 metre air rifle event at the 1984 Summer Olympics.

References

1963 births
Living people
Chinese male sport shooters
Olympic shooters of China
Shooters at the 1984 Summer Olympics
Place of birth missing (living people)
20th-century Chinese people